Bathyliotina glassi, commonly known as the spiny wheel shell, is a species of sea snail, a marine gastropod mollusk in the family Liotiidae.

Description
The size of the shell varies from 10 mm to 15 mm.

Distribution
This marine species occurs off the Philippines.

References

 McLean, J. H. 1988. Two New Species of Liotiinae (Gastropoda: Turbinidae) from the Philippine Islands. Veliger 30(4): 408–411

External links
 

glassi
Gastropods described in 1988